In computer programming, unit testing is a software testing method by which individual units of source code—sets of one or more computer program modules together with associated control data, usage procedures, and operating procedures—are tested to determine whether they are fit for use.

History 

Before unit testing, capture and replay testing tools were the norm. In 1997, Kent Beck and Erich Gamma developed and released JUnit, a unit test framework that became popular with Java developers. Google embraced automated testing around 2005–2006.

Description

Unit tests are typically automated tests written and run by software developers to ensure that a section of an application (known as the "unit") meets its design and behaves as intended. In procedural programming, a unit could be an entire module, but it is more commonly an individual function or procedure. In object-oriented programming, a unit is often an entire interface, such as a class, or an individual method. By writing tests first for the smallest testable units, then the compound behaviors between those, one can build up comprehensive tests for complex applications.

To isolate issues that may arise, each test case should be tested independently. Substitutes such as method stubs, mock objects, fakes, and test harnesses can be used to assist testing a module in isolation.

During development, a software developer may code criteria, or results that are known to be good, into the test to verify the unit's correctness. During test case execution, frameworks log tests that fail any criterion and report them in a summary. For this, the most commonly used approach is test - function - expected value.

Writing and maintaining unit tests can be made faster by using parameterized tests. These allow the execution of one test multiple times with different input sets, thus reducing test code duplication. Unlike traditional unit tests, which are usually closed methods and test invariant conditions, parameterized tests take any set of parameters. Parameterized tests are supported by TestNG, JUnit and its .Net counterpart, XUnit. Suitable parameters for the unit tests may be supplied manually or in some cases are automatically generated by the test framework. In recent years support was added for writing more powerful (unit) tests, leveraging the concept of theories, test cases that execute the same steps, but using test data generated at runtime, unlike regular parameterized tests that use the same execution steps with input sets that are pre-defined.

Advantages 
The goal of unit testing is to isolate each part of the program and show that the individual parts are correct. A unit test provides a strict, written contract that the piece of code must satisfy. As a result, it affords several benefits.

Unit testing finds problems early in the development cycle. This includes both bugs in the programmer's implementation and flaws or missing parts of the specification for the unit. The process of writing a thorough set of tests forces the author to think through inputs, outputs, and error conditions, and thus more crisply define the unit's desired behavior. The cost of finding a bug before coding begins or when the code is first written is considerably lower than the cost of detecting, identifying, and correcting the bug later. Bugs in released code may also cause costly problems for the end-users of the software. Code can be impossible or difficult to unit test if poorly written, thus unit testing can force developers to structure functions and objects in better ways.

In test-driven development (TDD), which is frequently used in both extreme programming and scrum, unit tests are created before the code itself is written. When the tests pass, that code is considered complete. The same unit tests are run against that function frequently as the larger code base is developed either as the code is changed or via an automated process with the build. If the unit tests fail, it is considered to be a bug either in the changed code or the tests themselves. The unit tests then allow the location of the fault or failure to be easily traced. Since the unit tests alert the development team of the problem before handing the code off to testers or clients, potential problems are caught early in the development process.

Unit testing allows the programmer to refactor code or upgrade system libraries at a later date, and make sure the module still works correctly (e.g., in regression testing). The procedure is to write test cases for all functions and methods so that whenever a change causes a fault, it can be quickly identified.  Unit tests detect changes which may break a design contract.

Unit testing may reduce uncertainty in the units themselves and can be used in a bottom-up testing style approach. By testing the parts of a program first and then testing the sum of its parts, integration testing becomes much easier.

Unit testing provides a sort of living documentation of the system. Developers looking to learn what functionality is provided by a unit, and how to use it, can look at the unit tests to gain a basic understanding of the unit's interface (API).

Unit test cases embody characteristics that are critical to the success of the unit. These characteristics can indicate appropriate/inappropriate use of a unit as well as negative behaviors that are to be trapped by the unit. A unit test case, in and of itself, documents these critical characteristics, although many software development environments do not rely solely upon code to document the product in development.

When software is developed using a test-driven approach, the combination of writing the unit test to specify the interface plus the refactoring activities performed after the test has passed, may take the place of formal design. Each unit test can be seen as a design element specifying classes, methods, and observable behavior.

Limitations and disadvantages 

Testing will not catch every error in the program, because it cannot evaluate every execution path in any but the most trivial programs. This problem is a superset of the halting problem, which is undecidable. The same is true for unit testing. Additionally, unit testing by definition only tests the functionality of the units themselves. Therefore, it will not catch integration errors or broader system-level errors (such as functions performed across multiple units, or non-functional test areas such as performance). Unit testing should be done in conjunction with other software testing activities, as they can only show the presence or absence of particular errors; they cannot prove a complete absence of errors. To guarantee correct behavior for every execution path and every possible input, and ensure the absence of errors, other techniques are required, namely the application of formal methods to proving that a software component has no unexpected behavior.

An elaborate hierarchy of unit tests does not equal integration testing. Integration with peripheral units should be included in integration tests, but not in unit tests. Integration testing typically still relies heavily on humans testing manually; high-level or global-scope testing can be difficult to automate, such that manual testing often appears faster and cheaper.

Software testing is a combinatorial problem. For example, every Boolean decision statement requires at least two tests: one with an outcome of "true" and one with an outcome of "false". As a result, for every line of code written, programmers often need 3 to 5 lines of test code. This obviously takes time and its investment may not be worth the effort. There are problems that cannot easily be tested at all – for example those that are nondeterministic or involve multiple threads. In addition, code for a unit test is as likely to be buggy as the code it is testing. Fred Brooks in The Mythical Man-Month quotes: "Never go to sea with two chronometers; take one or three." Meaning, if two chronometers contradict, how do you know which one is correct?

Another challenge related to writing the unit tests is the difficulty of setting up realistic and useful tests. It is necessary to create relevant initial conditions so the part of the application being tested behaves like part of the complete system. If these initial conditions are not set correctly, the test will not be exercising the code in a realistic context, which diminishes the value and accuracy of unit test results.

To obtain the intended benefits from unit testing, rigorous discipline is needed throughout the software development process. It is essential to keep careful records not only of the tests that have been performed, but also of all changes that have been made to the source code of this or any other unit in the software. Use of a version control system is essential. If a later version of the unit fails a particular test that it had previously passed, the version-control software can provide a list of the source code changes (if any) that have been applied to the unit since that time.

It is also essential to implement a sustainable process for ensuring that test case failures are reviewed regularly and addressed immediately. If such a process is not implemented and ingrained into the team's workflow, the application will evolve out of sync with the unit test suite, increasing false positives and reducing the effectiveness of the test suite.

Unit testing embedded system software presents a unique challenge: Because the software is being developed on a different platform than the one it will eventually run on, you cannot readily run a test program in the actual deployment environment, as is possible with desktop programs.

Unit tests tend to be easiest when a method has input parameters and some output. It is not as easy to create unit tests when a major function of the method is to interact with something external to the application. For example, a method that will work with a database might require a mock up of database interactions to be created, which probably won't be as comprehensive as the real database interactions.

Example 
Here is a set of test cases in Java that specify a number of elements of the implementation. First, that there must be an interface called Adder, and an implementing class with a zero-argument constructor called AdderImpl. It goes on to assert that the Adder interface should have a method called add, with two integer parameters, which returns another integer. It also specifies the behaviour of this method for a small range of values over a number of test methods.

import static org.junit.Assert.assertEquals;

import org.junit.Test;

public class TestAdder {

    // can it add the positive numbers 1 and 1?
    @Test
    public void testSumPositiveNumbersOneAndOne() {
        Adder adder = new AdderImpl();
        assertEquals(2, adder.add(1, 1));
    }

    // can it add the positive numbers 1 and 2?
    @Test
    public void testSumPositiveNumbersOneAndTwo() {
        Adder adder = new AdderImpl();
        assertEquals(3, adder.add(1, 2));
    }

    // can it add the positive numbers 2 and 2?
    @Test
    public void testSumPositiveNumbersTwoAndTwo() {
        Adder adder = new AdderImpl();
        assertEquals(4, adder.add(2, 2));
    }

    // is zero neutral?
    @Test
    public void testSumZeroNeutral() {
        Adder adder = new AdderImpl();
        assertEquals(0, adder.add(0, 0));
    }

    // can it add the negative numbers -1 and -2?
    @Test
    public void testSumNegativeNumbers() {
        Adder adder = new AdderImpl();
        assertEquals(-3, adder.add(-1, -2));
    }

    // can it add a positive and a negative?
    @Test
    public void testSumPositiveAndNegative() {
        Adder adder = new AdderImpl();
        assertEquals(0, adder.add(-1, 1));
    }

    // how about larger numbers?
    @Test
    public void testSumLargeNumbers() {
        Adder adder = new AdderImpl();
        assertEquals(2222, adder.add(1234, 988));
    }
}

In this case the unit tests, having been written first, act as a design document specifying the form and behaviour of a desired solution, but not the implementation details, which are left for the programmer. Following the "do the simplest thing that could possibly work" practice, the easiest solution that will make the test pass is shown below.

interface Adder {
    int add(int a, int b);
}
class AdderImpl implements Adder {
    public int add(int a, int b) {
        return a + b;
    }
}

As executable specifications

Using unit-tests as a design specification has one significant advantage over other design methods: The design document (the unit-tests themselves) can itself be used to verify the implementation. The tests will never pass unless the developer implements a solution according to the design.

Unit testing lacks some of the accessibility of a diagrammatic specification such as a UML diagram, but they may be generated from the unit test using automated tools. Most modern languages have free tools (usually available as extensions to IDEs). Free tools, like those based on the xUnit framework, outsource to another system the graphical rendering of a view for human consumption.

Applications

Extreme programming 
Unit testing is the cornerstone of extreme programming, which relies on an automated unit testing framework. This automated unit testing framework can be either third party, e.g., xUnit, or created within the development group.

Extreme programming uses the creation of unit tests for test-driven development. The developer writes a unit test that exposes either a software requirement or a defect. This test will fail because either the requirement isn't implemented yet, or because it intentionally exposes a defect in the existing code. Then, the developer writes the simplest code to make the test, along with other tests, pass.

Most code in a system is unit tested, but not necessarily all paths through the code. Extreme programming mandates a "test everything that can possibly break" strategy, over the traditional "test every execution path" method. This leads developers to develop fewer tests than classical methods, but this isn't really a problem, more a restatement of fact, as classical methods have rarely ever been followed methodically enough for all execution paths to have been thoroughly tested. Extreme programming simply recognizes that testing is rarely exhaustive (because it is often too expensive and time-consuming to be economically viable) and provides guidance on how to effectively focus limited resources.

Crucially, the test code is considered a first class project artifact in that it is maintained at the same quality as the implementation code, with all duplication removed. Developers release unit testing code to the code repository in conjunction with the code it tests. Extreme programming's thorough unit testing allows the benefits mentioned above, such as simpler and more confident code development and refactoring, simplified code integration, accurate documentation, and more modular designs. These unit tests are also constantly run as a form of regression test.

Unit testing is also critical to the concept of Emergent Design.  As emergent design is heavily dependent upon refactoring, unit tests are an integral component.

Unit testing frameworks 

Unit testing frameworks are most often third-party products that are not distributed as part of the compiler suite. They help simplify the process of unit testing, having been developed for a wide variety of languages.

It is generally possible to perform unit testing without the support of a specific framework by writing client code that exercises the units under test and uses assertions, exception handling, or other control flow mechanisms to signal failure. Unit testing without a framework is valuable in that there is a barrier to entry for the adoption of unit testing; having scant unit tests is hardly better than having none at all, whereas once a framework is in place, adding unit tests becomes relatively easy. In some frameworks many advanced unit test features are missing or must be hand-coded.

Language-level unit testing support
Some programming languages directly support unit testing. Their grammar allows the direct declaration of unit tests without importing a library (whether third party or standard).

Languages with built-in unit testing support include:

 Cobra
 D
 Rust

Languages with standard unit testing framework support include:

 Apex
 Crystal
 Erlang
 Go
 Julia
 LabVIEW
 MATLAB
 Python
 Racket
 Ruby

Some languages do not have built-in unit-testing support but have established unit testing libraries or frameworks. These languages include:

 ABAP
 C++
 C#
 Clojure
 Elixir
 Java
 JavaScript
 Objective-C
 Perl
 PHP
 PowerShell
 R with testthat
 Scala
 tcl
 Visual Basic .NET
 Xojo with XojoUnit

See also 

 Acceptance testing
 Characterization test
 Component-based usability testing
 Design predicates
 Design by contract
 Extreme programming
 Functional testing
 Integration testing
 List of unit testing frameworks
 Regression testing
 Software archaeology
 Software testing
 Test case
 Test-driven development
 xUnit – a family of unit testing frameworks.

References

Further reading

External links 

 Test Driven Development (Ward Cunningham's Wiki)

 
Extreme programming
Articles with example Java code
Types of tools used in software development